Emam Ashour Metwally Abdelghany (born 20 February 1998) is an Egyptian professional footballer who plays as a midfielder for Danish Superliga club Midtjylland and the Egypt national football team.

Honours

Club
Zamalek

Egyptian Premier League 2020–21, 2021–22
Egypt Cup: 2018–19, 2020–21
Egyptian Super Cup: 2019–20

International
Egypt U23

Africa U-23 Cup of Nations: 2019

References

External links
Profile at the FC Midtjylland website

1998 births
Living people
Egyptian footballers
Egyptian expatriate footballers
Egypt youth international footballers
People from Dakahlia Governorate
Association football wingers
Footballers at the 2020 Summer Olympics
Olympic footballers of Egypt
2021 Africa Cup of Nations players
Egyptian Premier League players
Haras El Hodoud SC players
Zamalek SC players
FC Midtjylland players
Expatriate footballers in Denmark